Elekmania is a genus of the tribe Senecioneae and the family Asteraceae. Most if not all of its members used to be placed in Senecio.

They are native to the Dominican Republic and Haiti.

The genus was first published by Bertil Nordenstam in Compositae Newslett. vol.44 on page 66 in 2006.

The genus name of Elekmania is in honour of Erik Leonard Ekman (1883–1931), who was a Swedish botanist and explorer.

Species
It includes 9 accepted species;
 Elekmania barahonensis 
 Elekmania buchii 
 Elekmania fuertesii 
 Elekmania haitiensis 
 Elekmania kuekenthalii 
 Elekmania marciana 
 Elekmania picardae 
 Elekmania samanensis 
 Elekmania stenodon

References

External links

Senecioneae
Asteraceae genera
Flora of the Dominican Republic
Flora of Haiti